The BachiBac is a high school diploma offered at schools run by the French and Spanish states. The first students started studying for the BachiBac in the 2010-11 school year.

The extra classes amount to 7 hours of weekly teaching in year 10 ( / ), and 8 hours in years 11 and 12 (terminale / ).

The programme was created by a 2008 agreement between Spain and France.

Schools 
The BachiBac is offered at 120 Spanish state schools in Spain and at the Liceo Español in Paris (France). , the French state offers the BachiBac at 97 state schools in France and at the École française de La Havane in Cuba.

See also 

 Education in France
 Education in Spain
 AbiBac (French-German)
 EsaBac (French-Italian)
 European Baccalaureate
 French-German Baccalaureate

External links 

 Overview over the BachiBac on the website of the French education ministry (in French)
 BachiBac curriculum (in French)
 List of Spanish schools that offer BachiBac (in Spanish)
 List of French schools that offer BachiBac (in French)

References 

France–Spain relations